Henry McLeish's term as first minister of Scotland began on 26 October 2000 when he was formally sworn into office at the Court of Session. It followed the death of Donald Dewar. McLeish served as the second First Minister and his premiership is the shortest of any officeholder. His term was dominated by his financial scandal dubbed as Officegate. The scandal resulted in McLeish's resignation on 8 November 2001.

McLeish entered office amid the mourning of his predecessor's death. As First Minister, he oversaw the introduction of free personal care for the elderly and initiated the Scottish Executive's response to the September 11 attacks in New York City. He also implemented the McCrone Agreement for education teachers in Scotland. McLeish managed several task forces designed to improve the competitiveness of Scottish industry, especially the PILOT project for Scottish oil and gas supply chains.

In his final months in office, McLeish was in a scandal involving allegations he sub-let part of his tax-subsidised Westminster constituency office without it having been registered in the register of interests kept in the Parliamentary office. Though McLeish could not have personally benefited financially from the oversight, he undertook to repay the £36,000 rental income. He resigned on 8 November 2001, having served only 1 year, 12 days.

Bid for Scottish Labour leadership 
The Inaugural First Minister, Donald Dewar, died on 11 October 2000 of a brain hemorrhage following a fall outside Bute House. The office of First Minister was filled by Jim Wallace until the election of a new leader was elected. The day after Dewar's funeral, McLeish launched his bid to be the next leader of the Labour Party in Scotland, with Jack McConnell later announcing his bid too.

The ballot was held amongst a restricted electorate of Labour MSPs and members of Scottish Labour's national executive, because there was insufficient time for a full election to be held. McLeish defeated his rival Jack McConnell by 44 votes to 36 in the race to become the second first minister.

Entering government

Nomination and appointment 
On 26 October 2000, a vote to nominate a First Minister by the Scottish Parliament was held. McLeish won the parliament's approval for appointment, defeating John Swinney, leader of the Scottish National Party, David McLeitchie, leader of the Scottish Conservatives, and independent MSP, Dennis Canavan, by 68 to 33, 19 and 3, respectively. On the same day, McLeish was presented by Her Majesty the Queen with a Royal Warrant of Appointment and was officially sworn in at the Court of Session in Edinburgh.

Cabinet 

On the following day, McLeish formed his administration. It was the continuation of the Labour-Liberal Democrat coalition that had existed under the Dewar government, with Jim Wallace remaining as Deputy First Minister. In the wake of the 2000 SQA exam controversy, he removed Sam Galbraith as education minister, replacing him with his leadership opponent McConnell. Wendy Alexander took over McLeish's former ministerial role, while Angus MacKay took McConnell's former finance portfolio.

Scotland's response to 9/11 
McLeish led the Scottish Executive's response to the September 11 attacks in the United States. He was initially concerned about Scotland's defence strategy and feared the country's major cities, such as Glasgow, Edinburgh and Aberdeen, would be targets based on their economic strength and significance to the Scottish, UK and European economies.

In the immediate aftermath of the attacks in the United States, McLeish instructed all airports in Scotland to be on alert and tighten their security measures. McLeish focussed on strengthening security, protection and defence systems in Scotland to ensure the country was equipped to deal with a large scale terrorist attack. McLeish lead the then Scottish Executive to working with the UK Government to ensure appropriate measures and strengthen security was in place within Scotland.

On September 13, 2001, McLeish moved a motion in the Scottish Parliament to send condolences to the people of the United States and New York. Through the motion, McLeish said "the Parliament condemns the senseless and abhorrent acts of terrorism carried out in the United States yesterday and extends our deepest sympathies to those whose loved ones have been killed or injured".

McLeish initially supported the War on Terror, however, twenty years on he regrets that the war ultimately turned out as a "war on Islam".

Officegate scandal 

In April 2001, reports emerged of McLeish receiving £4,000 annually from 1998 from the law firm Digby Brown, who were sub letting his constituency office in Glenrothes, Fife. Although the House of Commons Standards Commissioner questioned the reports, his spokesperson stated: "The matter has been dealt with. The income in question was not for Mr McLeish's personal use, it went straight into covering the costs of running the office. The scandal would become known as theOfficegate scandal.

In later October, McLeish released a statement in relation to paying £9,000 to the Fees Office at the House of Commons and the Presiding Officer of the Scottish Parliament, Sir David Steel, banned the debate of McLeish's financial records. Steel had highlighted the situation was a matter of Westminster, not the Scottish Parliament. On 28 October, the Fife Constabulary announced its launch of an investigation following complaints made against McLeish and he refused to answer questions from reporters.

By 2 November, the Leader of the Opposition at Holyrood, John Swinney, calls for McLeish's resignation after a "humiliating" appearance on the BBC's Question Time, when he admits he was unaware of the total sum of money involved. On 6 November, it is emerged that the rental income for sub letting the office from 1987 was £36,122. McLeish claimed it was an "honest mistake" and offered to pay the remaining fees. A survey by Scotland Today revealed, 77% of Scots believed he should resign as a result of the scandal.

Resignation 
On the early hours of 8 November, McLeish tendered his resignation as First Minister of Scotland.

See also 

 McLeish government

References 

Scottish governments
Ministries of Elizabeth II
2000 establishments in Scotland
2001 disestablishments in Scotland
Coalition governments of the United Kingdom
Scottish premierships